Caledia captiva, the caledia, is a species of silent slant-faced grasshopper in the family Acrididae. It is found in Australia.

References

External links

 

Acridinae
Orthoptera of Australia
Insects described in 1775